Quinton Davids (born 17 August 1975) is a South African former rugby union player.

Playing career
He did not play in any test matches during the tour, but played in four tour matches for the Springboks.

Davids made his test match debut for the Springboks in 2002 against  at Newlands in Cape Town. In 2003 he played only one test, that against Argentina and in 2004 he represented the Springboks in five test matches, with his last test against the All Blacks in Christcurch.

Test history

See also
List of South Africa national rugby union players – Springbok no. 706

References

1975 births
Living people
South African rugby union players
South Africa international rugby union players
Western Province (rugby union) players
Stormers players
Rugby union players from the Western Cape
Rugby union locks